Nolasco is a surname of Spanish/Portuguese origin. It is derived from the 13th century Catholic saint Peter Nolasco, who died in Barcelona in 1256. In 2014 the surname was most commonly found in Mexico (over 47 thousand bearers), the Philippines (over 18 thousand bearers), Brazil and Honduras (over 10 thousand bearers each).

Notable people with this surname include:
Amaury Nolasco (born 1970), Dominican-American actor
Bruno Nolasco (born 1986), Brazilian water polo player
Elena Highton de Nolasco, Argentine jurist
Elvis Nolasco, American actor
Ramon Nolasco (born 1949), Filipino politician
John Nolasco (born 1975), Dominican boxer
Juan Nolasco (born 1975), Mexican football manager and player
Julio Nolasco, Argentinian sports shooter
Julissa Nolasco, Puerto Rican politician
Margarita Nolasco Santiago, Puerto Rican politician
Matheus Nolasco (born 1995), Brazilian footballer
Mariana Nolasco (born 1998), Brazilian singer, YouTuber and actress
Manuel Jiménez Nolasco (born 1992), Mexican footballer
Pedro Nolasco (born 1962), Dominican boxer
Pierre-Nolasque Bergeret (1782–1863), French painter
Saint Peter Nolasco (1189–1256), Catholic Catalan saint
Sócrates Nolasco (1884–1980), Dominican writer
Ricky Nolasco (born 1982), American baseball player

See also 
 Nolasco spiny-tailed iguana, a Mexican species of lizards
 Nolasco leaf-toed gecko, a Mexican species of lizards
 San Pedro Nolasco Island, a Mexican island
 Dr. Juan G. Nolasco High School, a school in Manila, Philippines
 Edwin "Puruco" Nolasco Coliseum, a sporting arena in Puerto Rico

References